Lutheran High School may refer to:

Lutheran High School (Arkansas) — Little Rock, Arkansas
Lutheran High School (Elk Grove, California)
 Lutheran High School (Parker, Colorado)
Lutheran High School (La Verne, California)
Lutheran High School (Rockford, Illinois)
Lutheran High School (Springfield, Illinois)
Lutheran High School (Indianapolis), Indiana
Lutheran High School (Louisiana) — Metairie, Louisiana
Lutheran High School (Minnesota) — Mayer, Minnesota
Lutheran High School of Kansas City, Missouri
Lutheran High School (Salt Lake City, Utah) 
Lutheran High School (Milwaukee), Wisconsin

It may also refer to one of the following:

Arizona Lutheran Academy — Phoenix, Arizona
California Lutheran High School — Wildomar, California
Christ Lutheran High School (Illinois) — Buckley, Illinois
Christ Lutheran High School (Iowa) — Davenport, Iowa
Concordia Academy-Bloomington, Minnesota (formerly known as Lutheran High School of Greater Minneapolis) 
Concordia Lutheran High School (Indiana) — Fort Wayne, Indiana
Concordia Lutheran High School (Texas) — Tomball, Texas
Denver Lutheran High School — Denver, Colorado
Evergreen Lutheran High School — Des Moines, Washington
First Lutheran High School — Sylmar, California
Fox Valley Lutheran Academy — Elgin, Illinois
Fox Valley Lutheran High School — Appleton, Wisconsin
Great Plains Lutheran High School — Watertown, South Dakota
Hillcrest Lutheran Academy — Fergus Falls, Minnesota
Hope Lutheran High School — Winona, Minnesota
Illinois Lutheran High School — Crete, Illinois
Immanuel Lutheran College High School — Eau Claire, Wisconsin
Kettle Moraine Lutheran High School — Jackson, Wisconsin
Lakeside Lutheran High School — Lake Mills, Wisconsin
Lincoln Lutheran Middle/High School — Lincoln, Nebraska
Los Angeles Lutheran High School — Sylmar, California
Lutheran East High School — Cleveland Heights, Ohio
Lutheran High Northeast — Norfolk, Nebraska
Lutheran High School North (Michigan) — Macomb, Michigan
Lutheran High School North (Missouri) — St. Louis, Missouri
Lutheran High School North (Texas) — Houston, Texas
Lutheran High School Northwest — Rochester Hills, Michigan
Dallas Lutheran School (Texas) — Dallas, Texas
Lutheran High School of Hawaii —  Honolulu, Hawaii
Lutheran High School of Orange County — Orange, California
Lutheran High School of Philadelphia — Philadelphia, Pennsylvania
Lutheran High School of St. Charles County — St. Peters, Missouri
Lutheran High School of San Antonio — San Antonio, Texas
Lutheran High School of San Diego — San Diego, California (former name of Victory Christian Academy)
Lutheran High School South — St. Louis, Missouri
Lutheran High School Westland, Michigan
Lutheran High School West — Rocky River, Ohio
Manitowoc Lutheran High School, Wisconsin
Michigan Lutheran High School — St. Joseph, Michigan
Michigan Lutheran Seminary School — Saginaw, Michigan
Milwaukee Lutheran High School, Wisconsin
Minnesota Valley Lutheran High School — New Ulm, Minnesota
Northeastern Wisconsin Lutheran High School — Green Bay, Wisconsin
Northland Lutheran High School — Kronenwetter, Wisconsin
Pacific Lutheran High School — Torrance, California
Racine Lutheran High School — Racine, Wisconsin
Saint Paul Lutheran High School — Concordia, Missouri
St. Croix Lutheran High School — West St. Paul, Minnesota
Seattle Lutheran High School, Washington
Sheboygan Area Lutheran High School, Wisconsin
Shoreland Lutheran High School — Somers, Wisconsin
South Bay Lutheran High School — Inglewood, California
Trinity Lutheran High School — Reseda, California
Valley Lutheran High School (Arizona) — Phoenix, Arizona
Valley Lutheran High School (Michigan) — Saginaw, Michigan
Walther Lutheran High School — Melrose Park, Illinois
West Lutheran High School — Plymouth, Minnesota
Winnebago Lutheran Academy — Fond du Lac, Wisconsin
Wisconsin Lutheran High School — Milwaukee, Wisconsin